Mark Pearson (born 1980) is a London, United Kingdom-based entrepreneur and investor. He founded and served as CEO of Markco Media, a European discount network. Markco Media is the parent company of MyVoucherCodes.

In June 2014, Pearson sold Markco Media to the publicly listed mobile payments firm Monitise plc in a reported £55m deal.

Pearson is an active investor and mentor. The Sunday Times Rich List 2011 valued his fortune at £60m ($100m).

Career

When Pearson left school aged 16 he took up a place at a local catering college. He entered and won a nationwide cooking competition, leading to his employment by Claridge’s.

Pearson then went on to manage his own chain of restaurants after taking out a small loan from his grandmother.

Aged 23, Pearson started Roses by Design, a company that sold fresh rose petals with tiny messages written upon them. It was whilst running this business that Pearson learnt about affiliate marketing.

Pearson was approached by Interflora and Flowers Direct, which both asked if they could put discount code banners for their businesses on his web pages, and then pay him a commission for each resulting sale. He found he was earning more money from these commission payments than from selling his own roses.

This led to the idea of My Voucher Codes, which launched in November 2006 when Pearson was 26. He paid £300 for the first version of the site. He ran the site from his bedroom until 2009, when he opened an office in Croydon. He moved the business to a central London location in 2011.

Personal life

Pearson grew up on a council estate in Liverpool with his mother and sister. He traces the origin of his drive to succeed to time spent in a domestic violence refuge, where he realised he had to be the ‘man of the family’.

In 2010 Pearson appeared on Channel 4’s The Secret Millionaire, where he was exposed to the realities of gun crime and domestic violence in Nottingham. He donated £115,000 to three charities. Pearson says big charities “wind [him] up because they cost so much to run” and the purpose for him appearing on The Secret Millionaire was to “meet people on the ground who don’t get the spotlight”.

Pearson lives with his fiancé Aaron and their surrogate twins.

Hackathons
In 2012, Pearson founded Hackathon London, an event that invites developers to build tools and services in teams or individually, giving them the chance to pitch ideas to active investors and business mentors.

In November 2012, Pearson spotted on Twitter that the Young Rewired State Hackathon in Scotland, for coders under 18 years of age, would be cancelled if it didn't receive funding. He subsequently sponsored the event, enabling it to go ahead.

Controversy
On 1 July 2010, Pearson's company, Groupola.com, ran a deal where the public could purchase an iPhone 4 for £99 instead of the RRP of £499. The high traffic of people wanting the phone brought the servers hosting the site down and caused a backlash on Twitter and Facebook  Although the company reported to have 200 iPhones, only 10 iPhones were available.

Investments
According to The Telegraph, Pearson has invested around £5m in a total of nine firms, giving a minimum investment of £100,000 each time.

His portfolio includes Shopwave, an iPad payment system for retailers which also monitors sales, and mobile analytics firm Calq. He invested £1m in British 'unicorn' Ve Interactive, which grew from a team of 30 to 700 people in 18 offices worldwide. In June 2015, Ve Interactive was estimated to be valued at $3bn. Ve was forced into administration on 7 April 2017 after HM Revenue & Customs issued a petition for winding up order on 3 April 2017, having previously served a winding-up petition in February 2017. The company was subsequently bought out of administration for £2m by a consortium of investors including Pearson.

In October 2014, one of Pearson's investments, Playlists.net, was acquired by Warner Music Group for an undisclosed sum.

Fuel Ventures 
In December 2013, Pearson co-founded Fuel Ventures, an early-stage e-commerce investment fund and startup studio. Fuel Ventures was co-founded alongside Paul Rous, an entrepreneur and ex-corporate financier who was previously at Goldman Sachs.

Fuel Ventures also invited everyday investors to contribute to the fund through crowdfunding website Seedrs, raising £539,900. In August 2015, it was announced that British tennis player Andy Murray had invested in Fuel Ventures through Seedrs.

Awards
 2010 - Real Business Growing Business Awards "Young Entrepreneur of the Year" award 
 2011 - Ernst and Young "Emerging Entrepreneur of the Year" award 
 2011 - Smarta "Young Gun" award 
 2012 - Digital Entrepreneur Awards, "Digital Entrepreneur of the Year"

References

External links
 Mark Pearson homepage
 MyVoucherCodes

1980 births
Businesspeople from Liverpool
Living people